The 2012–13 Süper Lig (known as the Spor Toto Süper Lig for sponsorship reasons) was the 55th season of the Süper Lig, the highest football league of Turkey. Galatasaray are the defending champions. The season began on 17 August 2012 and ended on 19 May 2013.

On 5 May, Galatasaray won a record 19th Turkish title after beating Sivasspor 4–2.

Teams 

Samsunspor, Manisaspor and Ankaragücü were relegated at the end of the 2011–12 season after finishing in the bottom three places of the standings. Ankaragücü concluded 31 years at top level, Manisaspor returned to second level after 2 years and Samsunspor immediately returned to second one.

The relegated teams were replaced by 2011–12 TFF First League champions Akhisar Belediyespor, runners-up Elazığspor and promotion play-off winners Kasımpaşa S.K. Elazığspor returned to the top level after 8 years by making two successive promotions. Akhisar Belediyespor makes its debut in Turkey's top flight. Kasımpaşa returned immediately after their relegation to the First League in the 2010–11 season. Elazığspor got sponsorship from Sanica Boru and changed their name to "Sanica Boru Elazığspor".

Team overview

Managerial changes

League table

Positions by round

The following table represents the teams position after each round in the competition.

Results

Statistics

Top goalscorers

Top assists

Yellow cards

Red cards

Hat-tricks

References

Süper Lig seasons
Turkey
1